Piano is a 2001 South Korean television series starring Cho Jae-hyun, Go Soo, Kim Ha-neul and Jo In-sung. It aired on SBS from November 21, 2001 to January 10, 2002 on Wednesdays and Thursdays at 21:55 for 16 episodes.

A melodrama about a father's love for his children and a forbidden romance between stepsiblings, Piano received high ratings during its airing, as well as acting recognition at the year-end network awards ceremony.

Synopsis
Han Eok-kwan (Cho Jae-hyun) is a ruthless, foul-mouthed small-time gangster in Busan. When fellow gangster Dok-sa (Lee Jae-yong) betrays their boss Byun Hak-soo (Im Dong-jin) to take his place as the new boss, Eok-kwan is exiled from the gang. Then a former lover contacts him to meet her in Seoul, but once he gets there, all he finds is a 10-year-old boy named Jae-soo, who claims to be his son. At first he plans to abandon the boy, but unable to do it, ends up raising him.

Shin Hye-rim (Jo Min-su) is a widow with two children, 12-year-old daughter Soo-ah and 10-year-old son Kyung-ho. After her husband, a district attorney, dies, she leaves Seoul with her children and moves to Busan, where she opens a piano school. Eok-kwan falls head over heels in love with the piano teacher, and they later marry.

Shortly after, Hye-rim dies in a boating accident. Soo-ah and Kyung-ho, who've always resented their new stepfather, blame him for her death and try to leave the family home, but Eok-kwan begs them to stay. Transformed into a loving and hardworking father, he raises the three children to the best of his abilities.

A few years pass, and all three children, and their sister Joo-hee (played by Kim Hee-jung first, then by Jung Da-hye), are now young adults. Unbeknownst to Eok-kwan, his biological son Jae-soo (Go Soo) and stepdaughter Soo-ah (Kim Ha-neul) are deeply in love with each other. Though not related by blood, they know that a romantic relationship between them would be taboo, so they suppress their feelings. After Kyung-ho kills a man attempting to rape Soo-ah, Jae-soo takes the rap and goes to prison in his place, with his spotless record ensuring a short sentence. Kyung-ho escapes to Seoul.

When Jae-soo is released from prison after several years, he studies to become a doctor. Soo-ah meanwhile works at a record shop. Kyung-ho, still a rebellious and angry young man, returns to Busan and becomes involved in the city's criminal underworld.

Cast

Main cast
 Cho Jae-hyun as Han Eok-kwan 
 Go Soo as Han Jae-soo 
 Kim Hak-joon as young Jae-soo
 Kim Ha-neul as Lee Soo-ah
 Kang Bo-kyung as young Soo-ah
 Zo In-sung as Lee Kyung-ho 
 Choi Tae-joon as young Kyung-ho
 Jo Min-su as Shin Hye-rim, widow of In Hak

Supporting cast
 Jo Hyung-ki as Si-sook
 Jung Da-hye as Han Joo-hee (daughter of Eok-kwan and Hye-rim, paternal sister of Jae-soo, and maternal sister of Kyung-ho and Soo-ah)
 Kim Hee-jung as young Joo-hee
 Kim Young-chan as Jae-min
 Lee Jae-yong as Dok-sa
 Jung Sung-hwan as Young-tak
 Kim Ha-kyun as Deputy section chief Oh
 Im Dong-jin as Byun Hak-soo
 Yang Geum-seok as Kim In-soon
 Hwang In-young as Woo Min-kyung
 Song Jae-ho as Dr. Woo
 Baek Seung-hyeon as Kyung-ho's friend
 Im Dae-ho as bakery employee
 Jo Sang-ki as bakery employee
 Shin Seung-hwan as Suk-chol, gangster, Kyung-ho's enemy
 Lee Bo-hee as Lee Eun-shim
 Hong Yeo-jin as Mok-po's Neighbor of Han Eok-kwan
 Kim Ji-young as sister-in-law of Shin Hye-rim
 Jo Hyung-ki as brother-in-law of Shin Hye-rim
Kim Young-mi as Jang Eun-ji

Rating
Piano was the second most successful drama of 2001, only being surpassed by Ladies of the Palace. The highest rating that the show reached was 40.2%.

Awards
2001 SBS Drama Awards
Top Excellence Award, Actor: Cho Jae-hyun
Excellence Award, Actress: Kim Ha-neul
New Star Award: Go Soo
New Star Award: Jo In-sung
Popularity Award: Go Soo
Top 10 Stars: Cho Jae-hyun

References

External links
Piano official SBS website 
Piano official SBS videos website 

Seoul Broadcasting System television dramas
2001 South Korean television series debuts
2002 South Korean television series endings
Korean-language television shows
South Korean romance television series
South Korean melodrama television series
Television series by JS Pictures